The Orya–Tor languages are a family of just over a dozen Papuan languages spoken in Western New Guinea, Indonesia.

Classification
The Tor family, named after the Tor River, is clearly established. Its closest relative appears to be Orya.

Stephen Wurm (1975) linked Orya and the Tor languages with the Lakes Plain languages, forming a branch of his Trans–New Guinea phylum. Clouse (1997) found no evidence of such a connection. Malcolm Ross (2005) linked them instead with part of another erstwhile branch of TNG in a Tor–Kwerba proposal, and Usher makes a broadly similar proposal. Glottolog accepts only the link with Orya as having been demonstrated.

Languages

Foley (2018)
Foley (2018) provides the following classification.

Foley considers the inclusion of Sause within the Tor family to be questionable due to insufficient lexical evidence. See Kapauri–Sause languages.

Usher (2020)
Timothy Usher provides the following classification:

Jofotek and Mander are found to be the same language, whereas the ISO conflation of Edwas and Bonerif is found to be spurious.
A Wares language is not attested. (The Wares people are not known to have a distinct language, and the language of the village of Wares is Mawes.)

Proto-language

Phonemes
Usher (2020) reconstructs the consonant inventory tentatively as follows:

{| 
| *m || *n ||  ||  ||
|-
| *p || *t || *s || *k || *kʷ
|-
| *b || *d || *dz || || *gʷ
|-
| *w || *ɾ ||  ||  ||
|}
The stop *d is marginal and only occurs initially. *ɾ does not occur initially.

{| 
| *i ||  || *u
|-
| *e || || *o
|-
| *ɛ || *ə || *ɔ
|-
| || *a ||
|}

Pronouns
The pronouns Ross reconstructs for proto-Orya–Tor are,

{| class=wikitable
|-
| rowspan=2| I || rowspan=2| *ai || exclusive we || ?
|-
| inclusive we || *ne
|-
| thou || *emei || you || *em
|-
| s/he || *je || they || ?
|}

Usher (2020) reconstructs the pronouns of the East Tor Coast branch as:
{| 
|+East Tor Coast
! !!sg!!pl
|-
!1excl
|rowspan=2|*ai/ana||*ai-saise (?)
|-
!1incl
|*ne-saise (?)
|-
!2
|*im[i]||*im[i]-saise
|-
!3
|*dei||*dei-saise
|}

Basic vocabulary
Some lexical reconstructions by Usher (2020) are:

{| class="wikitable sortable"
! gloss !! Proto-Orya-Tor River !! Proto-Tor River !! Orya
|-
! head
| *nəbaɾ || *nəbaɾ || 
|-
! leaf/hair
| *aɾ[ɛ/a][n/ŋ] || *aɾ[ɛ/a][n/ŋ] || ala
|-
! eye
| *nVwɛ || *nVwɛ || nwe
|-
! nose
| *masɛ || *masɛ || mase
|-
! tongue
| *mapəɾ[Vm] || *mafəɾVm || mahal
|-
! foot/leg
| *ta[g]əna || *ta[g]əna || tana
|-
! breast
| *mo̝m || *mo̝m || mom
|-
! louse
| *nɛna || *nɛna || 
|-
! dog
| *gʷəɾa || *gʷəɾa || 
|-
! pig
| *gʷas || *gʷas || 
|-
! bird
| *dzu || *dzu || 
|-
! egg
| *s[u]w[e̝] || *s[u]w[e̝] || 
|-
! tree/wood
| *te̝ || *te̝ || te
|-
! woman/wife
| *kʷe̝ || *kʷe̝ || we
|-
! moon
| *p[ɛⁱ]n || *fɛⁱn || 
|-
! water
| *pɔ || *fɔ || ho
|-
! path
| *nVɾ || *nVɾ || 
|-
! name
| *bo̝s[ɛ/a] || *bo̝s[ɛ/a] || bose
|-
! one
| *apa || *afa || 
|-
! two
| *nawɛt || *nawɛt || 
|}

References

External links 
 Timothy Usher, New Guinea World, Proto–Orya – Tor River

 
Foja Range languages